Seed is a 1931 American pre-Code drama film directed by John M. Stahl. The screenplay by Gladys Lehman is based on a novel by Charles G. Norris.

Plot

Bart Carter has sacrificed a writing career so he can support his wife Peggy and their five children by working as a clerk in a New York City publishing house. When his former girlfriend Mildred Bronson, a literary agent who has been working in the Paris office, returns to the States, she arranges for Bart to draw his regular salary while working on a novel. Because his home life is so chaotic, Bart writes at Mildred's apartment during the day and frequently stays for dinner, and the two soon discover their old feelings for each other have been revived.

Bart's novel is published, and when Seed becomes a critical and commercial success, he abandons his family and moves to France with Mildred. Peggy opens a dress shop and lives with the children in an apartment above the store.

A decade later, the now-married Bart and Mildred return to New York. His grown children are delighted to see their father, who wishes to make amends for having left them. He suggests enrolling his daughter Margaret in finishing school, sending the twin boys to Harvard University, finding employment for his oldest son, and having the youngest boy live with him and Mildred. At her children's urging Peggy reluctantly agrees, although she feels she is losing them. Mildred assures her they will return to her one day, whereas she believes their renewed relationship with their father will place her own future with Bart in jeopardy.

Cast
John Boles as Bart Carter
Lois Wilson as Peggy Carter
Genevieve Tobin as Mildred
Raymond Hackett as Junior Carter
ZaSu Pitts as Jennie
Bette Davis as Margaret Carter
Richard Tucker as Bliss
Frances Dade as Nancy
Jack Willis as Dicky Carter
Dick Winslow as Johnny Carter
Bill Willis as Danny Carter
Dickie Moore as young Johnny Carter
Helen Parrish as young Margaret Carter

Production
Director John M. Stahl cast Bette Davis as Margaret Carter after seeing her in the studio commissary. It proved to be the smallest role of her career, and in later years she recalled "If you blinked for a moment, you would have missed me. I should have joined the extra's union."

Critical reception
Mordaunt Hall of The New York Times wrote that the plot was "undoubtedly an interesting theme, but in the film it merely results in being an adult idea offered in adolescent form." He thought John Boles was "too placid to be convincing" and John M. Stahl's direction was "unimaginative." He concluded "It is a lethargic and often dull production, in spite of the good acting by both Genevieve Tobin as Mildred and Miss Wilson as Peggy, Zazu Pitts as a servant and passable performances by some of the other players."

References

External links
 

Universal Pictures films
1931 films
1931 drama films
American drama films
Films based on American novels
Films set in New York City
Films set in Paris
American black-and-white films
Films directed by John M. Stahl
1930s English-language films
1930s American films